Corpus Christi Church, or variants thereof, may refer to:

Australia
 Corpus Christi Church, Nundah, listed on the Queensland Heritage Register

Belarus
 Corpus Christi Church, Nesvizh

Malta
 Corpus Christi Church, Għasri

Poland
 Corpus Christi Basilica, Kraków
 Corpus Christi Church, Wrocław

Republic of Ireland
 Corpus Christi Catholic Church, Home Farm Road, Drumcondra, Dublin 9

United States
 Corpus Christi Catholic Church (Fort Dodge, Iowa), listed on the National Register of Historic Places listings in Woodbury County, Iowa
 Corpus Christi R. C. Church Complex, listed on the National Register of Historic Places listings in Erie County, New York
 Corpus Christi Church (New York)
 Corpus Christi Cathedral (Corpus Christi, Texas)
 Corpus Christi Catholic Church (Celebration, Florida)

United Kingdom
 Corpus Christi Church, Boscombe
 Corpus Christi Church, Brixton

See also 
 Corpus Christi Cathedral (disambiguation)